Cynthia Stinger (born July 9, 1958 in Trenton, New Jersey) is an American former handball player who competed in the 1984 Summer Olympics, in the 1988 Summer Olympics, and in the 1992 Summer Olympics.

References

1958 births
Living people
Sportspeople from Trenton, New Jersey
American female handball players
Olympic handball players of the United States
Handball players at the 1984 Summer Olympics
Handball players at the 1988 Summer Olympics
Handball players at the 1992 Summer Olympics
21st-century American women
Medalists at the 1987 Pan American Games
Pan American Games gold medalists for the United States
Pan American Games medalists in handball